International trips made by the heads of state and heads of government to the United States have become a valuable part of American diplomacy and international relations since such trips were first made in the mid-19th century. They are complicated undertakings that often require months of planning along with a great deal of coordination and communication.

The first international visit to the United States was made by King Kalakaua of Hawaii in 1874, which was the first visit by a foreign chief of state or head of government.

The first South American head of state to visit the United States was Emperor Pedro II of Brazil in 1876.

Argentina

Bolivia

Brazil

Chile

Colombia

Ecuador

Guyana

Paraguay

Peru

Suriname

Uruguay

Venezuela

See also

 Foreign policy of the United States
 Foreign relations of the United States
 List of international trips made by presidents of the United States
 List of diplomatic visits to the United States
 State visit

References

External links
 Visits by Foreign Leaders – Office of the Historian (United States Department of State)

South America